The following lists events that happened during 2001 in South Africa.

Incumbents
 President: Thabo Mbeki.
 Deputy President: Jacob Zuma.
 Chief Justice: vacant then Arthur Chaskalson.

Cabinet 
The Cabinet, together with the President and the Deputy President, forms part of the Executive.

National Assembly

Provincial Premiers 
 Eastern Cape Province: Makhenkesi Stofile 
 Free State Province: Winkie Direko
 Gauteng Province: Mbhazima Shilowa 
 KwaZulu-Natal Province: Lionel Mtshali 
 Limpopo Province: Ngoako Ramathlodi
 Mpumalanga Province: Ndaweni Mahlangu
 North West Province: Popo Molefe 
 Northern Cape Province: Manne Dipico
 Western Cape Province: 
 until 12 November: Gerald Morkel 
 12 November-5 December: Cecil Herandien
 since 5 December: Peter Marais

Events

March
 9  – The National plan for Higher Education is gazetted. The Act restructured higher education in the country, most notably in technikons and vocational institutions & it reduced the number of higher education institutions from 36 universities and technikons to 22 higher education institutions, leading to the formation of institutions such as the University of Johannesburg, Durban University of Technology, Walter Sisulu University & Cape Peninsula University of Technology.
 18 – The Department of Health declines the offer of a large donation of HIV test kits made by Guardian Scientific Africa Incorporated.

April
 5 – George Bizos is awarded the 2001 International Trial Lawyer Prize of the Year by the International Academy of Trial Lawyers.
 11 – Pfizer Inc. agrees to supply AIDS patients attending public hospitals with an unlimited two-year supply of Fluconazole.
 30 – South Africa and India sign a declaration of intent on co-operation in health and medicine.

June
 11 – The Maloti-Drakensberg Transfrontier Conservation Area is signed into existence.
 12–15 – President Thabo Mbeki undertakes a state visit to the United Kingdom.

September
 1–8 – Durban hosts the World Conference against Racism.

October
 4 – The first 40 of a planned 1000 elephants, including 3 breeding herds, are translocated from the over-populated Kruger National Park to the war-ravaged Limpopo National Park.
 9 – The second South African National Census takes place.
 The name of the Gaza-Kruger-Gonarezhou Transfrontier Park is changed to the Great Limpopo Transfrontier Park.

December
 4 – Marike de Klerk, ex-wife of former State President Frederik Willem de Klerk, is murdered in her flat in Bloubergrant.

Unknown date
 The New National Party withdraws from the Democratic Alliance.
 The Mavericks Cape Town gentlemen's club opens.

Births
17 January - Bakang Sbakiie Seseane, GOAT
11 April - Jonathan Bird, cricketer
 14 September - Mmagauta Patricia Mokoena

Deaths

 26 April – Frederick Guy Butler, poet, academic and writer (b. 1918)
 1 June – Nkosi Johnson, HIV/AIDS activist. (b. 1989)
 13 August – Fanie du Plessis, athlete. (b. 1930)
 19 August – Donald Woods, journalist and activist. (b. 1933)
 30 August – Govan Mbeki, South African political activist and the father of Thabo Mbeki. (b. 1910)
 2 September – Christiaan Barnard, cardiac surgeon. (b. 1922)
26 November – Joe Modise, South African political activist. (b. 1929)
 4 December – Marike de Klerk, former first lady. (b. 1941)

Railways

Locomotives
 The first of seventeen Class 7E3, Series 1 and Series 2 dual-cab electric locomotives are rebuilt by Spoornet to single-cabs and enter service reclassified to Class 7E4.

Sports

Athletics
 4 March – Ian Syster wins his first national title in the men's marathon, clocking 2:13:30 in Durban.

See also
2001 in South African television

References

South Africa
Years in South Africa
History of South Africa